Paul de Chomedey, sieur de Maisonneuve (15 February 1612 9 September 1676) was a French military officer and the founder of Fort Ville-Marie (modern-day Montreal) in New France (Province of Quebec, Canada).

Early life
Maisonneuve was born into the aristocracy in Neuville-sur-Vannes in Champagne, France. He was the son of Louis de Chomedey, seigneur of Chavane, Germenoy-en-Brie, and his second wife Marie de Thomelin, the daughter of Jean de Thomelin, a king's counsellor and a treasurer of France in the generality of Champagne, and of Ambroise d’Aulquoy.

Paul de Chomedey grew up in the manor-house at Neuville-sur-Vanne, not far from the  Maisonneuve fief, which his father acquired in 1614. He had two sisters and one brother. He began his military career at 13 in Holland, where he also learned to play the lute.

He had a successful career in which he was noted for his ability and his honesty.

At 30, he was hired by Jérome le Royer de la Dauversiere, who was head of the Société Notre-Dame de Montréal. The latter had a vision that inspired him to build a society mission on Montreal Island in New France. Maisonneuve was hired to lead the colonists and ensure their safety in the new land.

Governor of Montreal

In 1642 Ville-Marie was founded on the southern shore of the Island of Montreal, where a chapel and a small settlement were built. A hospital, under the command of Jeanne Mance, was also established. Maisonneuve was the first governor of Montreal.

The settlers maintained peaceful relations with the Algonquin people, one of the indigenous tribes of the area. The first year of the colony's existence was peaceful. In 1643 a flood threatened the city. Maisonneuve prayed to the Virgin Mary to stop the inundation and when it abated, he erected a cross atop Mount Royal. A cross has been maintained there to the current day.

Of the local First Nations tribes with whom these French settlers had contact with, the Mohawk, who were already trading with the Dutch and English in New Amsterdam (modern New York City), resented French efforts to interrupt the trade. The Mohawk were based in present-day New York State, south of Montreal, and severely threatened the new colony. The Algonquin, in contrast, maintained peaceful relations with the newly arrived Europeans. Nevertheless, they were often at war with the Haudenosaunee (Iroquois), who discovered the existence of the new French settlement of Montreal, whose defence Maisonneuve commanded using his military training, only in 1643.

Already familiar with the terrain, the Haudenosaunee would often observe and engage the French settlers from the safety of the woods. That devastating strategy was the beginning of a long conflict between the groups as they were competing with each other for game and other resources. On 30 March 1644, the situation came to a head. Warned by their guard dogs as to the nearby presence of their enemies, a band of 30 settlers went into the forest to face their foes. Once in the woods, the French encountered 250 Haudenosaunee people in ambush, waiting for them. Retreating in the face of such uneven odds, Maisonneuve remained last so that the others could make it safely back to the fort, resulting in him being set upon by a Haudenosaunee chief. In this decisive moment, Maisonneuve fired twice on the chief, thus "killing him with his bare hands," as is sometimes quoted about the event, before returning to the safety of the fort amid much fanfare.

In 1645, Maisonneuve received news that his father had died, and he returned to France. There, he was offered the position of governor of New France but turned it down, wanting to continue his leadership of Ville-Marie. Maisonneuve returned to Montreal in 1647, and the wars with the Iroquois continued. In 1649, Maisonneuve stood as godfather for the first white child baptized in the colony. She was Pauline Hébert, the daughter of the fur-trader Augustin Hébert and his wife Adrienne Du Vivier, who had come to Montreal in 1648 with Maisonneuve and their elder daughter Jeanne.

In the spring of 1651, the Haudenosaunee attacks became so frequent and so violent that Ville-Marie thought that its end had come. Maisonneuve made all the settlers take refuge in the fort. By 1652, the colony at Montreal had been so reduced that he was forced to return to France to raise 100 volunteers to go with him to the colony the following year. If the effort had failed, Montreal would have been abandoned and the survivors relocated downriver to Quebec City. When the 100 arrived in the fall of 1653, the population of Montreal was barely 50 people. They included Jacques Archambault, who dug the first water well of the island in 1657, at the request of Maisonneuve.

Over time, the colony grew in size and eventually was large enough to be secure from the Haudenosaunee threat. Control of the colony was taken from the missionary society and taken up by the crown in 1663. Maisonneuve had not enjoyed the favour of the new governor-general, Augustin de Saffray de Mésy. In September 1665, Alexandre de Prouville, the lieutenant-general of Montreal, ordered Maisonneuve to return to France on indefinite leave. After 24 years as head of the colony, he left Montreal for good.

Later life 

Settling in Paris Maisonneuve lived in relative obscurity. In 1671, he welcomed Marguerite Bourgeoys at his home in Paris. With his encouragement, in 1657 she had established the Congregation of Notre Dame of Montreal, an order of teaching nuns that educated French and indigenous children.

Maisonneuve died in 1676; at his bedside were his young friend, Philippe de Turmenys, and his devoted servant, Louis Fin. On September 10, his funeral took place at the church of the Fathers of the Christian Doctrine, near the abbey of Saint-Étienne-du-Mont; he was also buried there.

Honours
After his death, Saint-Paul Street in Montreal was named after Maisonneuve, who had built his home in 1650 on the early street.

Nuns' Island was once called Île Saint-Paul in honour of the founder of Montreal. The current name of the island appears starting from the 19th century and was exclusively used from the 1950s on.

The Maisonneuve Monument was erected in 1895 on Place d'Armes in Old Montreal, to his memory. It is the work of Louis-Philippe Hébert (1850–1917). An imaginary model was used to represent Maisonneuve, as no authentic portrait exists of the first governor of Montreal.

De Maisonneuve Boulevard and Rue Chomedey in Downtown Montreal are named for him, as are Maisonneuve Park, the Collège de Maisonneuve, the neighbourhood of Chomedey in Laval, and the Maisonneuve pavilion, a dormitory at the Royal Military College Saint-Jean.

Gallery

See also

French colonization of the Americas
Timeline of Montreal history

External links
La pratique du luth en Nouvelle-France par Paul Chomedey de Maisonneuve (1612-1676) premier gouverneur de Montréal..., Web Robert DEROME, professeur honoraire d'histoire de l'art, Université du Québec à Montréal.

Novels 
 Lise Baucher-Morency / Gaëtane Breton, La périlleuse fondation de Ville-Marie, (book with musical CD) Éditions Planète rebelle (link ) 2017

References
 

 
 
 

1612 births
1676 deaths
Colonists of Fort Ville-Marie
People from Aube
People of New France
French Army soldiers
French nobility
History of Montreal
Governors of Montreal
Société Notre-Dame de Montréal
Persons of National Historic Significance (Canada)
17th-century Canadian politicians